The Jacksonville Axemen are a semi-professional rugby league team based in Jacksonville, Florida, U.S. They currently play in the USA Rugby League (USARL). They play their home games at the North Practice Soccer Fields at the University of North Florida.

Together with the [New Haven Warriors], the Axemen were founded in 2006 as an expansion team of the American National Rugby League (AMNRL). Since their inception they have become one of the most successful rugby football clubs in the United States both on and off the field. They advanced to the AMNRL playoffs in 2006, 2008, and 2009, and won the 2010 AMNRL Championship. The side currently holds the record for the largest margin of victory (96–8 as of 2016) in the league's history. In 2011 they became one of seven team to depart the AMNRL to form the new USARL, which kicked off in June of that year. Under the USARL, the Axemen have won two National Championships (2012 & 2018) and made three appearances ( 2013, 2014, 2016).

History
They are one of the most successful teams in America both in on-field and off-field operations, making it to the finals in four of their five years of play. Their team for 2009 included former National Rugby League player Sean Rutgerson and former international player Daryl Howland. They are also the first Rugby League team in the US to stream all their home games live on the internet in an effort expose the sport in the US to the rest of the world via the World Wide Web. They often appear on local television and radio shows and are supported by the local media community in Jacksonville.

The club was founded for the 2006 American National Rugby League season by Drew Slover and Australian Daryl Howland after the state of Florida (where both individuals resided) had no representation in the top level rugby league competition in the USA. After becoming the first AMNRL club to come from the southern state the Axemen had an impressive debut season finishing in the top six and qualifying for the playoffs; however they would eventually be knocked out by the New Jersey Sharks.  In their first 5 years of operations, the Axemen made AMNRL playoffs, 4 times, with two trips to the title game and one national championship title.

The Jacksonville Axemen hosted the teams of the Australia Day Challenge , January 26, 2008 at the University of North Florida, Hodges Stadium. This event drew 12,500 fans from 40 states in the US and 15 countries. They also hosted the "Rhinos Stampede to Florida" that saw the Leeds Rhinos and the Salford City Reds (both from the UK) visit Jacksonville for a 10-day training camp and game during early 2009 that saw 7000 fans visit Hodges Stadium. Later that year they Axemen also arranged and hosted the "HotelsofJacksonville.com Atlantic Cup" that saw the USA National Team play the Jamaica National team in a full international. A crowd of approximately 3500 attended the game.

The Axemen are believed to be the most recognizable Rugby League team in the USA. They hold the current record for most fans and supporters at home games with average crowds of 2500 and have merchandise sales that ship globally during the season.

In January 2011 the Axemen were one of seven AMNRL teams to announce they were departing to form the new USA Rugby League. They played their first game in the new league on June 4, 2011. The club managed to secure the inaugural minor premiership, however disappointingly were eliminated in the first week of the play-offs by the New Haven Warriors. They did, however, go on to win the National Championship in only their second year in the new league (2012)

On August 25, 2018, the Jacksonville Axemen defeated the Brooklyn Kings 58–16 to win the 2018 National Championship

Top Row: Sean Rutgerson (Coach), Jed Pearce, Lachlan Bristow, Jon Alexander, Steven Hill, Khalial Harris, James Campbell, Hunter Lawson, David Thomas, Kris Townsel, Glenn Spigelmyer, David Washington, Desta Bailey, Dr. B. Hudson Berrey (Team Physician)

Middle Row: Mary Slover (Head Athletic Trainer), Kyle Grinold, Montana Northcroft, Taylor “Thor” Youngling, Jon Purnell (C), Tyler “Sparky” McClain, Will Fletcher, Kevin Wathen, Alex Eberle

Bottom Row: Haley Frazer (Athletic Trainer),  Jessika Wojciechowski (AT Intern), Kayla Jones (Athletic Trainer), Leslie Quirk (AT Intern)

USARL season summaries

Logo and colors

For their inaugural American National Rugby League season the club adopted the colors of white, red and blue but the uniforms are predominantly white.

Title Sponsorship 
The 2006 and 2007 seasons the club's major jersey sponsor is T Mobile with Jaxbars.com being the back jersey sponsor.

The 2008 and 2009 the Axemen were title sponsored by Barons Brewing from Australia. This partnership and the efforts the Axemen put into marketing their Black Wattle beer, made Jacksonville the biggest market for the beer in Florida

2010 season added the Paradise Island Rental Community as the Major jersey sponsor as well as Heekin Orthopedic Specialists (Now Southeast Orthopedic Specialist) as a minor jersey sponsor & official medical partner

2011, 2012, and 2013 the Axemen's Title/Major jersey sponsor was Firehouse Subs, with minor jersey sponsorships from Heekin Orthopedic Specialists.

2014 Title/Major Sponsor: Coastal Spine & Pain Center

2015 Title Sponsor: Dr Clayman's Miracle Spa

2016 Title Sponsor: St. Vincent Healthcare

2017 the Axemen secured a 3-year partnership with 121 Financial Credit Union as their Major/Title Sponsor.

2018 Title Sponsor: 121 Financial Credit Union

2019 Title Sponsor: 121 Financial Credit Union

10th Anniversary 

In 2015, the Axemen celebrated their 10th season of operation.  A special 10th anniversary logo was created to help celebrate 10 season of Rugby League in Jacksonville.

Southeastern Rugby League Championship
In 2011 the Axemen launched a reserve grade competition, the Firehouse Subs Southeastern Rugby League Championship, which acts as a feeder club system for the Axemen to further develop players. It developed into teams known today like the Atlanta Rhinos.

Stadium
For their debut season the Axemen used the Hodges Stadium in North Florida as their home field and they agreed to do the same for the 2007 season including reaching an agreement with the AMNRL to host the 2007 Grand Final Championship game there.

The Axemen currently play their home games at the North Soccer Practice fields at the University of North Florida.

First ever American Football vs Rugby League game

The Jacksonville Axemen played a cross code game between Rugby League and American Football, by playing the Jacksonville Knights and defeated them 38-27 It may have been the first time that both an American Football team and a Rugby League team played a cross code game. Both teams received coaching in their opponent's sport and then played one half in full American Football equipment and rules before both teams removed the pads and helmets to play Rugby League in the second half. One of the best players to pull on this jersey JUSTICE DALEY was a prop-forward with great ball playing ability and hit harder than anybody.

International Events
The Jacksonville Axemen have had more international rugby league events than any other league or team.

Australia Day Challenge

Rugby league was widely exposed to Jacksonville residents during the Australia Day Challenge on January 26, 2008, an exhibition match hosted by actor Russell Crowe between the South Sydney Rabbitohs (Australia) and the Leeds Rhinos (England) - the first international Rugby League match held in the United States.

The Jacksonville Axemen were co-hosts to the event and received a higher level of local recognition through participation in and the success of the event.

Statistics and records

Biggest Winning Margin

Biggest Losing Margin

Most Points for the club

Most Points in a Match

Biggest Attendance

Honors
AMNRL Championship titles: 1 (2010)
USARL: 
Winners (2): (2012), (2018)

See also

Rugby league in the United States

References

External links
 Official Website

2006 establishments in Florida
American National Rugby League teams
Rugby clubs established in 2006
Rugby league in Florida
Sports teams in Jacksonville, Florida
USA Rugby League teams